Sir Anthony Howell Meurig Evans,  (born 11 June 1934) is an internationally known jurist, judge, and barrister, and a former Lord Justice of Appeal.

He currently holds the office of Chief Justice of the Dubai International Financial Centre Courts and is the first person to hold that office. 

Sir Anthony was appointed to the post in April 2005 by Sheikh Maktoum bin Rashid Al Maktoum, who was then ruler of Dubai. He formerly held high judicial office in the courts of England and Wales, sitting on the Court of Appeal and the Queen's Bench Division of the High Court of Justice, including the Commercial Court (which is part of the Queen's Bench Division.

References

1934 births
20th-century English judges
Living people
Lords Justices of Appeal
Knights Bachelor
Members of the Privy Council of the United Kingdom